St John's Cathedral or the Cathedral Church of St John the Divine (Scottish Gaelic Ard-eaglais Eòin an Diadhair) is a cathedral of the Scottish Episcopal Church, located in the town of Oban. It is one of the two cathedrals of the Diocese of Argyll and The Isles, and one of the sees of the Bishop of Argyll and The Isles.

The MacDougalls of Dunollie and Campbells of Dunstaffnage began the project to build an episcopal church in Oban in 1846. The first church was completed in 1864. The committee for the erection of the church appointed Charles Wilson as the architect, but following his death, the work was entrusted to his successor, David Thomson of the architectural practice Heath Wilson & David Thomson, Glasgow. As the Bishop of Argyll and The Isles Dr. Alexander Ewing was in Europe on account of his health, the church was consecrated by the Bishop of London Rt. Revd Archibald Campbell Tait on Thursday 22 September 1864. It was described as being of small dimensions, consisting only of a nave and chancel, the total length being  inside. The east window was filled with painted glass and donated by Sir Donald Campbell, 3rd Baronet of Dunstaffnage in memory of his brother Sir Angus. The rose window in the western gable was filled with painted glass, the gift of David Hutcheson. The contractors for the building were John McCorquodale for masonry, Andrew Fairgrieve for plumbing, Hugh Brown for slating, George McAlpine for plastering, Charles McLaren for glazing, R. Reguson & Sons for painting, and G. Smith & Co for ironwork. The cost of the first phase of the building was around £1,400.

In 1882 a side aisle was added to the south of the 1864 building. The 1910 additions were by architect James Chalmers of Glasgow. Funds ran out before construction finished – thus we are left with a unique Cathedral (designated as such in 1920 ) with each phase clearly visible in the Cathedral you see today and the steel girders still supporting the incomplete vision of a grand structure.

A screen was added in 1958 designed by Ian Gordon Lindsay.

List of rectors and provosts

1859-1880: Robert Jackson MacGeorge
1881-1896: Arthur Ingelby (formerly curate of Hawley, Hampshire)
 1896-1930: Charles Pressley Smith 
 1930-1942: George Preston Tonge (formerly Rector of Christ Church, Falkirk)
 1959–1979: Charles Copland (formerly Canon of St Mary's Episcopal Church, Arbroath)
 1980-1986: Nigel Abbott (former Vicar of Holy Trinity Coventry)
 2000–2012: Norman MacCallum
 2012–2017: Nicki McNelly
 2018 - 2022: Margi Campbell
 2022 - present: Shona McKenzie

See also

Cathedral of the Isles – co-cathedral in Millport on the Isle of Cumbrae
St Columba's Cathedral – Oban's Roman Catholic cathedral

References

Oban
Churches in Argyll and Bute
Category C listed buildings in Argyll and Bute
Listed cathedrals in Scotland
Religion in Oban